Martin Gordon Autry (March 5, 1903 – January 26, 1950) was a backup catcher in Major League Baseball who played between  and  for the New York Yankees (1924), Cleveland Indians (1926–28) and Chicago White Sox (1929–30). He was born in Martindale, Texas.

In a six-season career, Autry was a .245 hitter (68-for-277) with two home runs and 33 RBI in 120 games, including 21 runs, 17 doubles and three triples. In 96 catching appearances, he posted a .965 fielding percentage with just 12 errors in 268 chances.

Autry managed in minor league baseball from 1937–42 and 1947–49, including six years at the helm of the Savannah Indians. He was the incumbent skipper of the Yankees' Double-A farm team, the Beaumont Exporters, when he died from a heart attack in Savannah, Georgia, at age 46 during the 1949–50 offseason.

Sources
, or Retrosheet

1903 births
1950 deaths
Atlanta Crackers players
Austin Rangers players
Baseball players from Texas
Chicago White Sox players
Cleveland Indians players
Fort Worth Cats players
Louisville Colonels (minor league) players
Major League Baseball catchers
Minor league baseball managers
Nashville Vols players
New Orleans Pelicans (baseball) players
New York Yankees players
People from Caldwell County, Texas
Pittsfield Hillies players
Savannah Indians players